Agios Polykarpos is a seaside settlement in Nafpaktia, Aetolia-Acarnania, Greece, located 6 km west of Antirrio and 15 km southwest of Nafpaktos. According to the 2011 census, it had 19 inhabitants.

Description
The settlement is named after the church of Saint Polycarpus.

In 1981, Agios Polykarpos became a settlement of the community of Makyneia. In 1989, Agios Polykarpos became part of the municipality of Antirrio, which is a municipal unit of the municipality of Nafpaktia since 2011.

Historical population

References

Populated places in Aetolia-Acarnania
Nafpaktia